Majida is a village and Gram Panchayat in Purbasthali II CD block in Kalna subdivision of Purba Bardhaman district in West Bengal, India.

Geography
The nearest railway station located near the village is Belerhat railway station which is at distance of 82 kilometres from Bandel Junction.
The nearest river located near the village is Bhagirathi which nearly forms the eastern boundary of the Purbasthali II community development block.

The nearest town located near the village is Patuli.

Demographics
As per the 2011 Census of India Majida had a total population of 9,267, of which 4,789 (52%) were males and 4,478 (48%) were females. Population below 6 years was 931. The total number of literates in Majida was 5,157 (61.86% of the population over 6 years).

Education
Majida Gana Bidya Bhaban. High School is a Bengali medium co-educational higher secondary school established in 1955.

References

Villages in Purba Bardhaman district